Marathon carriage is a type of modern-day carriage that is designed and used for driving competitions. The carriage is designed to carry a driver and a groom (navigator).  The driver drives the horse(s) through the course while the groom counterbalances the carriage on tight turns and helps the driver with direction and upcoming hazards.  The carriage consists of four wheels, two to four wheel disk brakes, suspension (either air or spring), a fifth wheel for turning tight corners and either a pole or shaft depending on the number of horses used for the event.

See also
Combined driving

Carriages